The sport of football in the country of the Dominican Republic is run by the Federación Dominicana de Fútbol. The association administers the national football team, as well as the Liga Dominicana de Fútbol. In the Dominican Republic, baseball is the most popular sport, followed by basketball or association football, depending on the area in the Dominican Republic. Football is considered to be in constant growth since 2012. This sport was usually played from middle to high-class high school students, specially in urban areas like Santo Domingo, Santiago, Puerto Plata, Moca and Jarabacoa, however, in the last few years, the sport has expanded and it is played mostly everywhere in the country. That the sport was first played by wealthy children created an extreme commercialization on the sport, where most of the available football courts, where children are to master their skills, have to be rented, prices often range between 40 - 50 USD an hour, nonetheless, there are futsal courts available for free.

Nowadays, football can be as popular as basketball, as interest keeps growing, Dominicans are constantly waiting for their squad to bring a Gold Cup title to the country.

History

Football was first introduced to the Dominican Republic at the beginning of 20th Century. For a long time, the country was not renowned in the sport, due to football being played only in amateur level.

From 2010s, more concrete attempts were made to professionalise football in the country. In 2014, the Liga Dominicana de Fútbol was founded as the first-ever professional football league in the country, in an attempt to boost the country's football profile.

Since 2020s, Dominican Republic has experienced a dramatic rise in fortune at the sport. The country's U-23 team qualified for the first time ever in the 2020 CONCACAF Men's Olympic Qualifying Championship, but fell short from qualifying, losing all three games and failed to reach the 2020 Summer Olympics. Nonetheless, its rise in fortune has been facilitated by the recent success of the U-20 team, when the country reached a major football final for the first time in 2022 CONCACAF U-20 Championship. Though failed to win the trophy, the Dominican Republic was able to secure two historic football debut in 2023 FIFA U-20 World Cup as well as the 2024 Summer Olympics. Its recent rise in fortune has been attributed to the professionalisation of football in the country, which began in 2014.

League

Liga Dominicana de Fútbol is the top professional league in the Dominican Republic, it began in 2014.

League system

Until 2014

National team

The  Dominican Republic national team has never qualified for a major tournament such as the CONCACAF Gold Cup or World Cup.

References